Perkinsville is a locale in Steuben County in the U.S. state of New York. It is the birthplace of Patty Maloney. As of the 2000 U.S. census, Perkinsville has an average household size of 2.66 persons.

From 1882 to 1963, Perkinsville was on the New York (Hoboken) to Buffalo Main Line of the Delaware, Lackawanna & Western Railroad (1882–1960) and Erie Lackawanna Railroad (1960–1963). Tracks were removed through Perkinsville in 1963 by order of the United States Interstate Commerce Commission to promote highway transportation.  As of 2008, Perkinsville has no rail service.

References

Populated places in Steuben County, New York